Jeff Hall may refer to:

 Jeff Hall (American football) (born 1976), former American football placekicker
 Jeff Hall (animator), cartoon animator and director
 Jeff Hall (footballer) (1929–1959), English footballer
 Jeff Hall (golfer) (born 1957), English professional golfer
 Jeff Hall (politician) (born 1951), African-American accountant and politician
 Jeff R. Hall (1978–2011), American plumber and neo-Nazi murdered by his son

See also
 Geoff Hall (disambiguation)
 Jefferson Hall, historic building at the University of Virginia
 Jeffrey C. Hall (born 1945), American geneticist and chronobiologist